is a song recorded by Japanese hip hop duo Creepy Nuts, Vocaloid producer and songwriter Ayase, and singer-songwriter Lilas Ikuta. It was released on March 20, 2022, through Onenation and Sony Music Associated Records. The song was featured on the All Night Nippon 55th-anniversary stage drama Ano Yoru o Oboe Teru. Later "Baka Majime" was included on Creepy Nuts' third studio album Ensemble Play, scheduled for release on September 7.

Release and composition

On December 21, 2021, it was announced that Creepy Nuts, a radio host of Creepy Nuts' All Night Nippon 0, and Yoasobi, consisting of Ayase and Lilas Ikuta, a radio host of Yoasobi's All Night Nippon X, would collaborate to sing a theme for JOLF's All Night Nippon 55th-anniversary stage drama , starring Yudai Chiba, and Hikaru Takahashi. It is scheduled for broadcasting on March 20 and 27, 2022. Due to the song is not based on novel, Ayase and Ikuta did not use the name Yoasobi to promote.

On March 15, 2022, they announced the title "Baka Majime", and its cover artwork, set to be released on March 20, alongside the accompanying music video. The song aired for the first time on both two radio show on the same day. Written by two members of Creepy Nuts: DJ Matsunaga and R-Shitei, and Ayase, "Baka Majime" is described as a "human hymn", that praises seriously baka (fool) people who do their best. It was composed in the key of A♯ minor, 91 beats per minute with a running time of two minutes and fifty-two seconds.

Charts

Release history

References

External links
 

2022 singles
2022 songs
Japanese-language songs
Sony Music Entertainment Japan singles